Marshalls Creek is a  tributary of the Brodhead Creek in the Poconos of eastern Pennsylvania in the United States.

Marshalls Creek was named after Edward Marshall, a pioneer citizen. Variant names were "Marshall Creek" and "Marshall's Creek".

See also
List of rivers of Pennsylvania

References

Rivers of Pennsylvania
Rivers of Monroe County, Pennsylvania
Tributaries of Brodhead Creek